Pogoneleotris heterolepis is a species of fish in the family Butidae endemic to the marine and brackish waters of Malaysia.  This species is the only known member of its genus.

References

Butidae
Monotypic fish genera
Taxa named by Pieter Bleeker